Ahmet Baitursynuly (romanized: Ahmed Baitūrsynūly, ; Russified: Ахмет Байтурсынов) ( 5 September 1872 — 8 December 1937) was a Kazakh intellectual who worked in the fields of politics, poetry, linguistics and education.

Baitursynuly reformed the Kazakh alphabet. In 1912, he excluded all the purely Arabic letters not used in the Kazakh language and added letters specific to the Kazakh language. The new alphabet, named Tote jazu (meaning straight writing), is still used by Kazakhs living in China, Afghanistan, and in Iran. Baitursynov also developed the basics of Kazakh and the scientific terminology for the definition of Kazakh grammar. In 1937, he was executed by a firing squad during the Great Purge.

Early life, education
Ahmet Baitursynuly was born to a Muslim Kazakh family in what is today Kostanay Region, Kazakhstan and was educated at the Orenburg Teachers' School. After graduating in 1895, Baitursynov held teaching positions in a number of cities in Kazakhstan, including Aktobe, Kostanay and Karkaralinsk.

When Ahmet was 13 years old, the police officers led by Colonel Yakovlev came to the village and staged a pogrom.  Ahmet's father, Baitursyn Shoshak-uly, and three of Ahmet's brothers beat up Colonel Yakovlev. As a punishment, they were sent by Russian authorities to Siberia for 15 years.

Ahmet obtained literacy in Kazakh, Persian, Ottoman Turkish, and Arabic from the village mullahs.  In his teenage years, he was sent to the Turgai Russian-Kazakh School by his relatives to learn more Russian. After graduating from there, Ahmet moved to Orenburg to continue his education by attending a four-year teacher's school, founded by Kazakh intellectual Ibrahim Altynsarin.  In Orenburg, Ahmet faced financial difficulties, but still graduated from school in 1895. The same year of his graduation, he published his first article, "Kirgizskie primety i poslovitsy" ("Kazakh Superstitions and Proverbs") in a regional newspaper.

Ahmet taught at the village schools in the Aktyubinsk, Kostanay and Karkaraly regions. While working as a teacher in a Russian-Kazakh school in the Kostanay region, Ahmet lived in a house near a Russian forester, whose daughter, Alexandra Ivanovna, fell in love and married him. Their marriage was committed in a Muslim mosque in the village of Auliyekol. Ivanovna converted to Islam, and changed her name to Badrisafa Muhammetsadikova Baitursynova. They lived in Kostanay, where he worked as a teacher in a Russian-Kazakh school. The following year, Ahmet and his wife moved to Omsk, then to Karkaralinsk, where they stayed until 1909.

Political activity

Activism, imprisonment (1905-1909)
In 1905, he collaborated with other Kazakhs to form the Kazakh wing of the Constitutional Democrat Party. Baitursynov was one of the authors of the Karkaraly Petition, which  advocated to stop the expropriation of land from the Kazakhs, suspend the flow of immigrants, and to establish popular zemstvos. In 1907, he was first imprisoned for criticizing the Tsarist administration, and then in 1909 again for 8 months without a trial in the Semipalatinsk prison. His involvement in politics probably led to him being exiled from the Steppe regions. After being exiled, Baitursynov moved to Orenburg.

All-Russian Central Committee of the Communist Party of the Soviet Union in 1919 On August 27, the political protests by B against the decision to join the Kostanay district in the Chelyabinsk region became the basis for the return of Kostanay district to Kazakhstan. It was 1920. He was a member of the Kazakh ASSR government, formed in August 1920 – 1921, and served as the Commissioner of Population of the Kazakh ASSR in 1920–1921.

In 1922 he worked as the Academic Center at the Regional People's Commissariat, the Scientific and Literary Commission of the People's Commissariat of Commerce in 1922–1925, and the Chairman of the Research Society for the Kazakh Region. Baitursynov was a member of various public services and at the same time he did not even enjoy his favorite teacher work.

From 1921 to 1925 he lectured in Orenburg, in 1926–1928 at the Kazakh Institute of National Education in Tashkent, taught Kazakh language and literature, history of culture. In 1928, due to the opening of the Kazakh State Pedagogical Institute in Almaty, he was transferred to the post of professor at the invitation of the rector. On June 2, 1929, together with 43 Alash movement activists, he was arrested in Almaty and sent to the Butyrskiy detention center in Moscow for investigation by the end of this year. In the 1930s, in the 1930s, the People's Commissars of the USSR, On April 4, Baitursynov was sentenced to death. This decision has been changed several times: in January 1931, ten years later, in 1932, in November, to be deported to Arkhangelsk for 3 years.

1926 Member of the Presidium of the First Turkological Congress - Ahmed Baitursynov, held in Baku

In May 1933, the rest of the time due to poor health allowed to spend with the family (his wife and daughter), who are being driven out of Western Siberia. In 1934, with the help of Gorky's wife EP Peshkova, Baitursynov was released early and returned to Almaty. There is no permanent job here, and short-term employment in various institutions. August 8, 1937, was again arrested and shot two months later, on December 8. The first book of the Baytursynuly - "The forty example" was published in 1909, the beginning of the whole generation. In his work, he concealed and humiliated the Russian colonial forces, the country's stagnant state. Baytursynuly is an interesting form of an example genre, idea of concept, socios of the toxic language. and it helped to awaken consciousness. The poet's civic dreams, poems and poems were published in a separate book called the Masa (1911). The main idea of Massa is to read publicly, to call for art education, to preach the culture, and to work. The poet urged the people to overcome such deficiencies as darkness, indifference, and marching. Upgrading Abai's educational and critical traditions, Baitursynov's 20th century. upgraded Kazakh literature to revolutionary-democratic level. Baitursynov also translated Kazakh poems AS Pushkin, LY Lermontov, F.Volter, SN Nadson. These translations are Baitursynov's themes, ideologically artistic works. She was anxious about the future of the country, and she became a spiritual leader of the Kazakh youth with a multifaceted work of wisdom.

Exile (1911-1917)

During his exile, he wrote articles for Ay Qap. In 1911, Baytursinuli published his first work of a distinctly political nature — Masa ("Mosquito"). In 1913, Baytursynuly, along with former deputy of the First State Duma, Alihan Bökeyhan, and Mirjaqıp Dulatulı, a poet and a writer, founded a Kazakh newspaper named Qazaq in Orenburg where Baitursynov served as the chief editor. The newspaper ran until the spring of 1918. During that time, he published "Qyryq Mysal" ("Forty Proverbs").  His other significant publication as well was a Kazakh translation of Ivan Krylov's fables.

Alash Orda (1917-1919)
During the Russian Revolution of 1917 occurred, Baitursynov returned to the steppes and began to work with the members of Alash Orda. With them, he sought for the Kazakhs to have an independent state. At the two Pan-Kyrgyz congresses in Orenburg, he participated in the creation of the Alash party and was one of the organizers and leaders of Alash Autonomy. At the end of that year, Baitursynov was elected to the Constituent Assembly from the Turgai constituency. On 4 April 1919, he was granted amnesty by the All-Russian Central Executive Committee. After that, Baitursynov sided with the Soviet government and joined the Bolshevik Communist Party. From 1919, he served as a Member of the Committee of Deputies of the Constituent Assembly and as Deputy Chairman of the Revolutionary Committee of the Kazakh Krai, as well as Commissioner of Enlightenment. In these capacities, he helped to reform education and to establish the first university in KazakSSR.

Later life, execution

In June 1929, he was reminded of political activity and arrested by the NKVD, and sent to prison in Kyzyl-Orda, as in tsarist times again with Mirjaqip Dulatuli, and then was sent to the Arkhangelsk region. His wife, Baitursynova and her adopted daughter Sholpan were sent to Tomsk. In 1934, at the request of E. Peshkova (wife of Maxim Gorky), who worked on the Red Cross Commission, Baitursynov was released. He reunited with his family who already had three adopted children in Alma-Ata. In October 1937, Baitursynov was arrested again for the last time for hiding "bourgeois nationalist sentiments". Two months later, on the 8th of December, he was executed. This resulted in an outcry, which was quickly and bloodily silenced.

Legacy

To this day, Baitursynov is held in great regard in Kazakhstan, but is viewed as somewhat tragic figure, signifying the extent of the numbers of authors, poets and thinkers who have perished due to the Soviet repressions.  The Baitursynov Home Museum in honor of Baitursynov was established in one of his former residences in Alma-Ata, and a number of streets were renamed in his memory across Kazakhstan. A statue of him is also to be found in the town of Kostenay. Baitursynov's work is also part of the curriculum for high school education system of Kazakhstan. Another of Baitursynov's significant accomplishments was his adaptation of Arabic script for the Kazakh alphabet.

In 2021, UNESCO included Akhmet Baitursynov on the list of UNESCO anniversaries for 2022–2023 in honor of the 150th anniversary of his birth.

In November 2022, a monument to Akhmet Baitursynov was unveiled. The solemn ceremony was attended by President Kassym-Jomart Tokayev, relatives of the scientist and representatives of the creative intelligentsia.

On December 30, 2022, in honor of the 150th anniversary of the great scientist-turkologist, publicist, prominent statesman Akhmet Baitursynov, a monument and a park were opened in Ankara.

References

The Geography of Civilizations: A Spatial Analysis of the Kazakh Intelligentsia's activities, From the Mid-Nineteenth to the Early Twentieth Century

1872 births
1937 deaths
People from Kostanay Region
People from Turgay Oblast (Russian Empire)
Bolsheviks
Russian Constituent Assembly members
All-Russian Central Executive Committee members
Kazakh-language poets
Kazakh-language writers
Kazakhstani poets
Kazakhstani journalists
20th-century poets
20th-century male writers
20th-century Kazakhstani writers
Kazakhstani male writers
Great Purge victims from Kazakhstan
Soviet rehabilitations
Writers from the Russian Empire